The Washington Commanders are a professional American football team based in the Washington metropolitan area. The team competes in the National Football League (NFL) as a member club of the league's National Football Conference (NFC) East division. They joined the NFL in 1932 as the Boston Braves. In 1933, the name was changed to the Boston Redskins, with the team moving to Washington, D.C., in 1937. The Redskins name was retired in 2020, with the team temporarily playing as the Washington Football Team until rebranding as the Commanders in 2022. Washington's first draft selection was Riley Smith, a blocking back from Alabama, in 1936.

Washington have selected a draft's first overall pick twice: Harry Gilmer in 1948 and Ernie Davis in 1962. Four eventual Hall of Famers were selected by Washington in the first round: Sammy Baugh, Darrell Green, Art Monk, and Charley Taylor. Two first-round picks by the team have been named NFL Rookie of the Year: quarterback Robert Griffin III in 2012 and defensive end Chase Young in 2020. Two Washington first-round draft picks have died during their active careers. The first was Davis, who was traded shortly after the selection to the Cleveland Browns for Bobby Mitchell and Leroy Jackson and died from leukemia before ever playing in an NFL game. The other was Sean Taylor, who the team selected fifth overall in 2004 and was fatally shot at home while rehabbing from an injury in November 2007.

Player selections

Footnotes

References

 
 
 
 
 
 
 
 
 
 
 
 
 
 

Washington Commanders
 
first-round draft picks